Wofford Heights is a census-designated place (CDP) in the southern Sierra Nevada, in Kern County, California, United States. The population was 2,200 at the 2010 census, down from 2,276 at the 2000 census.

Geography
California State Route 155 is the only highway in Wofford Heights, leading south to Lake Isabella and west through Alta Sierra and the Greenhorn Mountains.

Climate
According to the Köppen Climate Classification system, Wofford Heights has a semi-arid climate, abbreviated "BSk" on climate maps.
Wofford Heights' eastern front borders Lake Isabella. There are two major access points to the lake from Wofford Blvd: The first is the entrance to North Fork Marina and Tillie Creek Campground, and the second is Freear which is at the very end of East Evans Road near Wofford Heights Park.

History
I.L. Wofford founded the community as a resort in 1948. The Wofford Heights post office opened in 1953. It was a location for the 1970 biker film Angels Die Hard.

In 2016 the Erskine and Cedar fires burned more than 77,000 acres and more than 300 structures. As of 2019 the Lake Isabella area was considered a "very high fire hazard severity zone" due to desert winds and the nearby Sequoia National Forest. In addition, the median age of residents is 62, and many live on narrow roads which would be poor escape routes.

Demographics

2010
At the 2010 census Wofford Heights had a population of 2,200. The racial makeup of Wofford Heights was 2,037 (92.6%) White, 6 (0.3%) African American, 41 (1.9%) Native American, 10 (0.5%) Asian, 1 (0.0%) Pacific Islander, 26 (1.2%) from other races, and 79 (3.6%) from two or more races. Hispanic or Latino of any race were 156 people (7.1%).

The whole population lived in households, no one lived in non-institutionalized group quarters and no one was institutionalized.

There were 1,143 households, 173 (15.1%) had children under the age of 18 living in them, 428 (37.4%) were married couples living together, 110 (9.6%) had a female householder with no husband present, 55 (4.8%) had a male householder with no wife present.  There were 108 (9.4%) unmarried opposite-sex partnerships, and 13 (1.1%) same-sex married couples or partnerships. 440 households (38.5%) were one person and 255 (22.3%) had someone living alone who was 65 or older. The average household size was 1.92.  There were 593 families (51.9% of households); the average family size was 2.50.

The age distribution was 280 people (12.7%) under the age of 18, 111 people (5.0%) aged 18 to 24, 261 people (11.9%) aged 25 to 44, 731 people (33.2%) aged 45 to 64, and 817 people (37.1%) who were 65 or older.  The median age was 58.3 years. For every 100 females, there were 97.0 males.  For every 100 females age 18 and over, there were 97.7 males.

There were 1,924 housing units at an average density of 317.6 per square mile, of the occupied units 866 (75.8%) were owner-occupied and 277 (24.2%) were rented. The homeowner vacancy rate was 4.7%; the rental vacancy rate was 15.9%.  1,613 people (73.3% of the population) lived in owner-occupied housing units and 587 people (26.7%) lived in rental housing units.

2000
At the 2000 census there were 2,276 people, 1,162 households, and 670 families in the CDP. The racial makeup of the CDP was 93.28% White, 0.13% Black or African American, 1.23% Native American, 0.66% Asian, 0.04% Pacific Islander, 1.36% from other races, and 3.30% from two or more races.  6.24% of the population were Hispanic or Latino of any race.
Of the 1,162 households 14.3% had children under the age of 18 living with them, 46.2% were married couples living together, 7.6% had a female householder with no husband present, and 42.3% were non-families. 36.3% of households were one person and 21.1% were one person aged 65 or older.  The average household size was 1.94 and the average family size was 2.46.

The age distribution was 14.4% under the age of 18, 3.2% from 18 to 24, 15.0% from 25 to 44, 28.5% from 45 to 64, and 38.9% 65 or older.  The median age was 58 years. For every 100 females, there were 98.3 males.  For every 100 females age 18 and over, there were 94.8 males.

The median household income was $24,326 and the median family income  was $29,157. Males had a median income of $31,641 versus $30,294 for females. The per capita income for the CDP was $15,937.  About 13.4% of families and 20.2% of the population were below the poverty line, including 34.6% of those under age 18 and 9.4% of those age 65 or over.

References

Census-designated places in Kern County, California
Kern River Valley
Populated places in the Sierra Nevada (United States)
Populated places established in 1948
1948 establishments in California